Sosnová is a municipality and village in Opava District in the Moravian-Silesian Region of the Czech Republic. It has about 400 inhabitants.

History
The first written mention of Sosnová is from 1377.

Gallery

References

External links

Villages in Opava District